Atlantic North Airlines was a Vermont-based commuter carrier linking several cities in New England and New Jersey.

History 
Atlantic North was formed through the acquisition of SkyMaster Air Taxi of Laconia, New Hampshire in March 1993.

SkyMaster was itself formed in the mid-1980s and operated charter and air taxi services. Its initial route linked Laconia with Boston. Eventually SkyMaster would serve cities in New Hampshire, Vermont, Massachusetts, and New Jersey. 

The carrier's operations were short-lived and Atlantic North ceased all flights in August 1993.

Destinations 

Atlantic North operated scheduled services to Rutland, Vermont, Laconia, New Hampshire, Keene, New Hampshire, Boston, Massachusetts, and Newark, New Jersey. Keene was utilized as a hub connecting passengers, mail, and cargo between northern destinations and the cities of Newark and Boston. With the exception of a Saturday-only service between Laconia and Rutland,  this route network mirrored those operated by SkyMaster Airlines.

Fleet 
The carrier operated a fleet of Piper PA-31 Navajo and Beechcraft Model 99 aircraft. Additional equipment was leased as needed.

See also 
 List of defunct airlines of the United States

External links
 Atlantic North Airlines timetable and logo - airtimes.com

Defunct airlines of the United States
Airlines established in 1993
Airlines based in New Hampshire